Thomas Midgley Jr. (May 18, 1889 – November 2, 1944) was an American mechanical and chemical engineer. He played a major role in developing leaded gasoline (tetraethyl lead) and some of the first chlorofluorocarbons (CFCs), better known in the United States by the brand name Freon; both products were later banned from common use due to their harmful impact on human health and the environment. He was granted more than 100 patents over the course of his career. He contracted polio in 1940. In 1944 he was found strangled by a device he devised to allow him to get out of bed unassisted at his home in Worthington, Ohio. At the time, it was reported he was accidentally killed by his own invention. Privately, it was declared a suicide.

Early life 

Midgley was born in Beaver Falls, Pennsylvania, to a family with a history of invention. His father, Thomas Midgley Sr., was an inventor notably in the field of automobile tires. His maternal grandfather was James Emerson, who invented the "inserted tooth saw". His mother was Hattie Midgley (née Emerson). He grew up in Columbus, Ohio, and graduated from Cornell University in 1911 with a degree in mechanical engineering. On August 3, 1911, Midgley married Carrie M. Reynolds from Delaware, Ohio.

Career

Leaded gasoline 

Midgley began working at General Motors in 1916. In December 1921, while working under the direction of Charles Kettering at Dayton Research Laboratories, a subsidiary of General Motors, Midgley discovered (after discarding tellurium due to the difficult-to-eradicate smell) that the addition of tetraethyllead (TEL) to gasoline prevented "knocking" in internal combustion engines. The company named the substance "Ethyl", avoiding all mention of lead in reports and advertising. Oil companies and automobile manufacturers, especially General Motors which owned the patent jointly filed by Kettering and Midgley, promoted the TEL additive as an inexpensive alternative superior to ethanol or ethanol-blended fuels, on which they could make very little profit. In December 1922, the American Chemical Society awarded Midgley the 1923 Nichols Medal for the "Use of Anti-Knock Compounds in Motor Fuels". This was the first of several major awards he earned during his career.

In 1923, Midgley took a long vacation in Miami, Florida, to cure himself of lead poisoning. He found "that my lungs have been affected and that it is necessary to drop all work and get a large supply of fresh air".

In April 1923, General Motors created the General Motors Chemical Company (GMCC) to supervise the production of TEL by the DuPont company. Kettering was elected as president, and Midgley was vice president. However, after two deaths and several cases of lead poisoning at the TEL prototype plant in Dayton, Ohio, the staff at Dayton was said in 1924 to be "depressed to the point of considering giving up the whole tetraethyl lead program". Over the course of the next year, eight more people died at DuPont's plant in Deepwater, New Jersey.

In 1924, dissatisfied with the speed of DuPont's TEL production using the "bromide process", General Motors and the Standard Oil Company of New Jersey (now known as ExxonMobil) created the Ethyl Gasoline Corporation to produce and market TEL. Ethyl Corporation built a new chemical plant using a high-temperature ethyl chloride process at the Bayway Refinery in New Jersey. However, within the first two months of its operation, the new plant was plagued by more cases of lead poisoning, hallucinations, insanity, and five deaths.

The risks associated with exposure to lead were known at least 150 years before, when Benjamin Franklin wrote about his experiences as a typesetter. Midgley experienced lead poisoning himself, and was warned about the risk of lead poisoning from TEL as early as 1922. Midgley knew well the hazards of lead.  He investigated whether the risks, both in production and use, could be managed. Testing on the exhaust was completed, which he used to support the idea that 1 part tetraethyl lead per 1300 of gasoline could safely be used.  After the initial, tragic worker exposures, controls were developed to allow the process to operate safely. Leaded gasoline use grew exponentially. The chronic impacts of environmental lead were grossly underestimated.

On October 30, 1924, Midgley participated in a press conference to demonstrate the apparent safety of TEL, in which he poured TEL over his hands, placed a bottle of the chemical under his nose, and inhaled its vapor for 60 seconds, declaring that he could do this every day without succumbing to any problems. However, the State of New Jersey ordered the Bayway plant to be closed a few days later, and Jersey Standard was forbidden to manufacture TEL again without state permission. Production was restarted in 1926 after intervention by the federal government. High-octane fuel, enabled by lead, was important to the military. Midgley later took a leave of absence from work after being diagnosed with lead poisoning.  He was relieved of his position as vice president of GMCC in April 1925, reportedly due to his inexperience in organizational matters, but he remained an employee of General Motors.

Freon 
In the late 1920s, air conditioning and refrigeration systems employed compounds such as ammonia (NH3), chloromethane (CH3Cl), propane, methyl formate (C2H4O2), and sulfur dioxide (SO2) as refrigerants. Though effective, these were toxic, flammable or explosive. The Frigidaire division of General Motors, at that time a leading manufacturer of such systems, sought a non-toxic, non-flammable alternative to these refrigerants. 

Midgley, working with Albert Leon Henne, soon narrowed his focus to alkyl halides (the combination of carbon chains and halogens), which were known to be highly volatile (a requirement for a refrigerant) and also chemically inert. They eventually settled on the concept of incorporating fluorine into a hydrocarbon. They rejected the assumption that such compounds would be toxic, believing that the stability of the carbon–fluorine bond would be sufficient to prevent the release of hydrogen fluoride or other potential breakdown products. The team eventually synthesized dichlorodifluoromethane, the first chlorofluorocarbon (CFC), which they named "Freon".  This compound is more commonly referred to today as "Freon 12", or "R12".

Freon and other CFCs soon largely replaced other refrigerants, but also had other applications. A notable example was their use as a propellant in aerosol products and asthma inhalers. The Society of Chemical Industry awarded Midgley the Perkin Medal in 1937 for this work.

Later life and death 

In 1941, the American Chemical Society gave Midgley its highest award, the Priestley Medal. This was followed by the Willard Gibbs Award in 1942. He also held two honorary degrees and was elected to the United States National Academy of Sciences. In 1944, he was elected president and chairman of the American Chemical Society.

In 1940, at the age of 51, Midgley contracted polio, which left him severely disabled. He devised an elaborate system of ropes and pulleys to lift himself out of bed. In 1944, he was found entangled in the device and died of strangulation.

Legacy 

Midgley's legacy is the negative environmental impact of leaded gasoline and freon. Environmental historian J. R. McNeill opined that Midgley "had more adverse impact on the atmosphere than any other single organism in Earth's history", and Bill Bryson remarked that Midgley possessed "an instinct for the regrettable that was almost uncanny". Fred Pearce, writing for New Scientist, described Midgley as a "one-man environmental disaster."

Use of leaded gasoline, which he invented, released large quantities of lead into the atmosphere all over the world. High atmospheric lead levels have been linked with serious long-term health problems from childhood, including neurological impairment, and with increased levels of violence and criminality in America and around the world. Time magazine included both leaded gasoline and CFCs on its list of "The 50 Worst Inventions".

Midgley died three decades before the ozone-depleting and greenhouse gas effects of CFCs in the atmosphere became widely known. In 1987, the Montreal Protocol phased out the use of CFCs like Freon.

References

Further reading
 
 The Brilliant Inventor Who Made Two of History’s Biggest Mistakes  New York Times Magazine March 15 2023 Stephen Johnson

External links
 
 
 
 The Man Who Accidentally Killed The Most People In History (video by YouTube producer Derek Muller on Thomas Midgley Jr., April 2022)

1889 births
1944 deaths
20th-century American chemists
20th-century American engineers
20th-century American inventors
Accidental deaths in Ohio
Air pollution
Cornell University College of Engineering alumni
Deaths by strangulation in the United States
Environmental controversies
Human impact on the environment
Inventors killed by their own invention
Lead poisoning incidents
Mass poisoning
Members of the United States National Academy of Sciences
Ozone depletion
People from Beaver Falls, Pennsylvania
People with polio